Grenland Harbour is the port authority serving the Grenland region of Telemark, Norway, consisting of the municipalities of Skien, Porsgrunn and Bamble. It operates four ports, at Skien, Porsgrunn, Grenland Terminal at Brevik and Langesund. The agency is owned as an inter-municipal company.

External links
 Official website

Port authorities of Norway
Companies based in Porsgrunn
Porsgrunn
Skien
Bamble
Intermunicipal companies of Norway